The Lo Nuestro Award for Tropical Album of the Year is an honor presented annually by American television network Univision at the Lo Nuestro Awards. The accolade was established to recognize the most talented performers of Latin music. The nominees and winners were originally selected by a voting poll conducted among program directors of Spanish-language radio stations in the United States and also based on chart performance on Billboard Latin music charts, with the results being tabulated and certified by the accounting firm Deloitte. However, since 2004, the winners are selected through an online survey. The trophy awarded is shaped in the form of a treble clef.

The award was first presented to Un Nuevo Despertar by Puerto Rican singer Lalo Rodríguez in 1989. Puerto Rican singer Jerry Rivera won for the album Cuenta Conmigo (1993), which exceeded the sales of Siembra by Willie Colón and Rubén Blades, the highest-selling salsa album at the time. Fellow Puerto Rican artist Olga Tañón holds the record for the most wins with four, for the albums Siente el Amor... (1995), Yo Por Ti (2002), A Puro Fuego (2004), and Una Nueva Mujer (2006). Cuban singer Gloria Estefan won in 1994 for Mi Tierra and in 1996 for Abriendo Puertas;  both albums also earned the Grammy Award for Best Traditional Tropical Latin Album. American band Aventura, Venezuelan duo Chino & Nacho, Dominican duo Monchy & Alexandra, and Puerto Rican group Son by Four are the only musical ensembles to receive the accolade. In 2014, 3.0 by American singer Marc Anthony became the most recent recipient of the award. Puerto Rican singer Gilberto Santa Rosa is the most nominated artist without a win, with ten unsuccessful nominations.

Winners and nominees
Listed below are the winners of the award for each year, as well as the other nominees.

Multiple wins/nominations

See also

 Grammy Award for Best Merengue Album
 Grammy Award for Best Tropical Latin Album
 Grammy Award for Best Salsa Album
 Grammy Award for Best Salsa/Merengue Album
 Latin Grammy Award for Best Contemporary Tropical Album
 Latin Grammy Award for Best Merengue Album
 Latin Grammy Award for Best Salsa Album
 Latin Grammy Award for Best Tropical Fusion Album
 Latin Grammy Award for Best Traditional Tropical Album

References

Tropical Album of the Year
Tropical music albums
Awards established in 1989
Album awards